The Kleiner Odenwald (“Little Odenwald”) is the southern part of the central German hill range, the Odenwald, and is up to . It is also part of the natural region of Sandstein-Odenwald in the north of the state of Baden-Württemberg. Lying east-southeast of Heidelberg and south of the River Neckar, which separates the Kleiner Odenwald from the rest of the Odenwald, its landscape is shaped by the underlying sandstone that also dominates the northern Odenwald.

Geography

Location 
The Kleiner Odenwald lies in the counties of Rhein-Neckar and Neckar-Odenwald and on the territory of the city of Heidelberg. It is bounded in the north by the Neckar and the settlements of Neckargemünd and Eberbach, in the east by the Neckar and e.g.  by Obrigheim, in the south by Reichartshausen, Waibstadt and Eschelbronn and in the west by Wiesloch, Leimen and Heidelberg on the River Neckar. Municipalities in the area are: Lobbach, Bammental, Gaiberg, Wiesenbach, Aglasterhausen, Schwarzach, Neunkirchen and Schönbrunn. The most important streams are the Elsenz, Schwarzbach and Lobbach.

Somewhat east of the Kleiner Odenwaldes lies the  Bauland, south of the  Kraichgau and west of the Upper Rhine Plain. In the southeast is part of the Brunnen region.

Hills 
The hills and high points of the Kleiner Odenwald include the following – sorted by height in metres (m) above Normalhöhennull (NHN):
 Königstuhl (567.8 m),east of Heidelberg
 Hebert (518.8 m), south of Eberbach-Neckarwimmersbach
 Auerhahnenkopf (486.9 m), south of Heidelberg-Schlierbach
 Hirschhornberg (461.6 m), northwest of Oberschönbrunn
 Kolben (on the Oberen Neckarberg; 408.9 m), north-northeast of Schönbrunn-Moosbrunn
 Gaisberg (375.6 m), east of Heidelberg
 Neckarberge (367.5 m), south of Mückenloch-Neckarhäuserhof
 Oberer Stadtwald (360.6 m), east of Neckargemünd
 Unterer Stadtwald (325.5 m), southwest of  Neckargemünd
 Hirschberg (somewhat over 300 m), northeast of Nußloch
 Neckarriedkopf (293.8 m), southwest of Neckargemünd in the Unteren Stadtwald
 Hollmut (284.8 m), south of Neckargemünd
 Salzberg (259.3 m), west-southwest of Lobbach-Lobenfeld
 Bammertsberg (249.9 m), north of Bammental

References 

Regions of Baden-Württemberg
Special Areas of Conservation in Germany
!